Shirley Jean Dreiss (1949–1993) was an American scientist working in the fields of hydrology and hydrogeology. After gaining her PhD from Stanford University, she joined the faculty of the University of California at Santa Cruz, where she became Professor and Chair of the Department of Earth Sciences. She made important contributions to the understanding of water flow through karst aquifers and fluid flow in subduction zones. At the time of her early death in a car accident, she was studying the groundwater system of Mono Lake in California. She was awarded the Birdsall Distinguished Lectureship from the Geological Society of America, which was renamed the  Birdsall-Dreiss Distinguished Lectureship after her death.

Life 

Shirley Dreiss was born in 1949. She died on December 14, 1993, at the age of 44, in a car accident. Her death was reported by the Santa Cruz Sentinel.

Education 

Dreiss earned her Bachelor of Science degree with honors, in geology, from the University of Texas, Austin, and her master's degree from the University of Missouri, Columbia, advised by Stan Davis. Dreiss gained her doctorate from Stanford University, where she worked with Irwin Remson and developed a new approach to describe water flow through karst aquifers. Remson described her as a "gifted scientist" who created "brilliant formulations" in her thesis.

Career and research 

Dreiss joined the faculty of the University of California at Santa Cruz in 1979. At the time of her death in 1993, she was professor and chair of the Department of Earth Sciences at UCSC. Dreiss was an expert in a wide range of specialisms, including groundwater hydrology, groundwater contamination, complex aquifers, arid basin hydrology, water and contaminant transport through unsaturated soils, and the hydrogeology of subduction zones.

Continuing the descriptions of karst water flow that she developed for her PhD, Dreiss expanded her work to regional-scale transport through karst

Dreiss was a member of a National Academy of Sciences committee to study the Mono Lake ecosystem. At the time of her death, Dreiss was working on Mono Lake groundwater hydrology, and several papers were published after her death describing this work.

Dreiss undertook pioneering work on fluid flow in subduction zones, and seafloor sediments.  She served on two panels for the international Ocean Drilling Program.

Dreiss was a member of the Coordinating Board of the California Water Resources Center, and a member of the National Academy of Sciences Committee to Review the EPA's Environmental Monitoring and Assessment Program.

Awards and recognition 

In 1991, Dreiss was awarded the prestigious Birdsall Distinguished Lectureship for the Hydrogeology Division of the Geological Society of America. Her lectures were titled "The Hydrogeology of an Active Subduction Zone" and "Regional Scale Transport in a Karst Aquifer." After her death, and through contributions by friends and colleagues, the lectureship was renamed as the Birdsall-Dreiss Lectureship.

A special section of the journal Water Resources Research was created in her honor

Dreiss is profiled by the American Geophysical Union Virtual Hydrologists Project that aims to recognize the legacy of eminent hydrologists

References 

American hydrologists
Women hydrologists
American women geologists
20th-century American geologists
Hydrogeologists
1949 births
1993 deaths
University of California, Santa Cruz faculty
Stanford University alumni
University of Texas alumni
University of Missouri alumni
Road incident deaths in California
20th-century American women scientists